Kumiko Sakino (先野久美子 Sakino Kumiko, born September 9, 1975) is a retired Japanese volleyball player who played for Hisamitsu Springs.

Clubs
Mitajirijoshi Girls High School (Now SEIEI High School) (1992-1994)
Daiei/Orange Attackers (1994–2000)
Hisamitsu Springs (2000-2011)

National team
 1997, 2000, 2007

Honours
Team
Japan Volleyball League/V.League/V.Premier　Champions (2): 2002,2006-07　Runners-up (1): 2005-06
Kurowashiki All Japan Volleyball Championship　Champions (2): 2006,2007
Empress' Cup 　Runners-up (1): 2007
Individual
2000 6th V.League: Spike award, Best 6
2002 8th V.League: Most Valuable Player, Best 6
2005 11th V.League: Spike award, Best 6
2007 2006-07 V.Premier League: Most Valuable Player, Best 6

References

External links
Hisamitsu Springs Officialsite

1975 births
Living people
People from Shimonoseki
Japanese women's volleyball players